= London Metro =

London Metro may refer to:

- London Underground, a rapid transit system in London, England
- Metro (British newspaper), a free newspaper in London, England
